Fruean is a Samoan surname that may refer to the following people:
Brianna Fruean (born 1998), activist and environmental advocate for Samoa
Robbie Fruean (born 1988), New Zealand rugby union footballer
Sandra Fruean (born 1945), American Samoan politician, judge, and civil servant
Tuaolo Manaia Fruean (born 1995)

English-language surnames